Joseph Finger (7 March 1887 – 6 February 1953) was an Austrian American architect. After immigrating to the United States in 1905, Finger settled in Houston, Texas in 1908, where he would remain for the duration of his life. Finger is best remembered for his role in bringing modern architecture to Texas.

Early years
Joseph Finger was born 7 March 1887 in Bielitz, Austria-Hungary to Henri Finger (1862-1941) and Hani Seifter (1870-1947). After finishing high school and technical training, he moved to the United States in 1905.

Career
Finger settled first in New Orleans in 1905, then moved to Houston, Texas in three years later. He found employment with C. D. Hill & Company, an architecture firm based in Dallas, where he worked for about five years. 

Finger joined a series of architecture partnerships, starting with Green & Finger in 1913. At that firm, he designed the DeGeorge Hotel, located at the corner of Preston and Labranch. His second partnership was with Lamar Q. Cato (Finger & Cato). After 1922, he worked independently. By the late 1920s, he established a robust business for hotel design, completing three hotels outside Houston, and the Auditorium Hotel, the Ben Milam Hotel, the Plaza Hotel, and the Texas State Hotel, all in Houston. Many of these hotels catered to wealthy residents with modern amenities such as air conditioning and running ide-water. All of these Houston hotels were still standing through the first part of 2012, when the Auditorium and Texas State still operated as hotels, the DeGeorge was used as a hotel for veterans, and the Plaza as a bank. By the end of 2012, however, the Ben Milam was taken down.

While conservative style marked Finger's luxury hotels, some of his other buildings reflected Art Deco style. In 1925, he designed the Temple Beth Israel, more recently repurposed as a theater building for Houston Community College. His 1929 building, the Houston Turn-Verein Clubhouse, employed some Austrian-inspired "zig-zag" Art Deco elements. Meanwhile he was the artitect of over two dozen Art Deco grocery stores for the Weingarten chain. 

Though Finger established a practice of commercial architecture, he also designed many single-family residences, especially in the Riverside Terrace neighborhood in Houston. One of these was for Abe Weingarten. Jesse H. Jones contracted for his services for a mixed-use building to house the Houston Chamber of Commerce with a store front for Levy Brothers' Dry Goods, a collaboration with Alfred C. Finn. This design team later produced Jefferson Davis Hospital, which occupied a site more recently occupied by the Federal Reserve Building.
 
From 1944 until his death in 1953, Finger worked in a partnership with George W. Rustay.

Finger designed the 1939 Houston City Hall, designed in a stripped classical style.  In response to criticism from Houston mayor R. H. Fonville, who wanted a style with more classical reference, Finger said, "Here in America we are rapidly developing our own type of architecture which is far above that of foreign countries. We are building for the masses, not the classes."  Above the lobby entrance of the City Hall is a stone relief of two men taming a wild horse, symbolizing a community coming together to form a government to tame the world around them.  This sculpture, and the twenty-seven other friezes around the building, were carved by Beaumont artist Herring Coe and co-designer Raoul Josset.

Personal life
On June 18, 1913, Finger married Gertrude Levy (1891-1985), a Houston native. The couple had one son, Joseph Seifter Finger (1918-2003), who also practiced architecture.

In Houston, Finger was a member of the Benevolent and Protective Order of Elks, the Houston Chamber of Commerce, Houston Turn-Verein, B'nai B'rith, and the Westwood Country Club.

Death and legacy
On 6 February 1953, a month short of his 66th birthday, Finger died in Houston. He is buried in Beth Israel Mausoleum in Beth Israel Cemetery.

Works

References

1887 births
1953 deaths
20th-century American architects
People from Bielsko
Austro-Hungarian emigrants to the United States
Architects from Houston